The 2022 Women's Africa Cup of Nations, (also referred to as WAFCON 2022) officially known as the 2022 TotalEnergies Women's Africa Cup of Nations for sponsorship purposes, was the 14th edition of the biennial African international women's football tournament organized by the Confederation of African Football (CAF), hosted by Morocco from 2 to 23 July 2022.

The tournament also doubled as the African qualifiers to the 2023 FIFA Women's World Cup. The top four teams qualified for the World Cup, and two more teams advanced to the inter-confederation play-offs.

Nigeria were the three-time defending champions, having won the previous 3 editions in 2014, 2016 and 2018; but had its journey ended in the semi-finals after losing to the hosts Morocco on penalties, making it for the first time neither Nigeria or Equatorial Guinea featured in the final. The hosts went on to lose to South Africa in the final, as South Africa claimed its first ever continental trophy after five previous attempts. With this triumph, South Africa joined Nigeria as the only countries to have won both the men's and women's competition.

This was the first edition to feature 12 teams as the 2020 edition, which would have been the first, was cancelled due to the COVID-19 pandemic in Africa. The Morocco vs Nigeria semi-final broke the WAFCON attendance records with 45,562 spectators.

Host selection
Morocco were announced as hosts on 15 January 2021. This is the first time a North African Arab country has hosted the Women's Africa Cup of Nations.

Mascot
The mascot for this edition of the tournament was unveiled as "TITRIT" (a Moroccan Berber name meaning "star" or "celebrity"), a young lioness clothed with the home jersey of the host nation's national football team, with a traditional Moroccan tiara.

Qualification

Morocco qualified automatically as hosts, while the remaining eleven spots were determined by the qualifying rounds.

Qualified teams

Venues
The tournament was held in Casablanca and Rabat.

Squads

Match officials
A total of 16 referees, 16 assistant referees and 8 VAR referees were appointed for the tournament.

Originally, Fatima El Ajjani (Morocco) was assigned as video assistant referee only. However, she was assigned as principal referee during the tournament after Aïssata Boudy Lam (Mauritania) sustained an injury.

Referees

  Suavis Iratunga
  Zomadre Kore
  Shahenda El-Maghrabi
  Letticia Viana
  Lidya Tafesse
  Maria Rivet
  Aïssata Boudy Lam
  Fatima El Ajjani
  Bouchra Karboubi
  Antsino Twanyanyukwa
  Ndidi Patience Madu
  Salima Mukansanga
  Mame Faye
  Akhona Makalima
  Vincentia Amedome
  Dorsaf Ganouati
  Shamira Nabadda

Assistant referees

  Asma Ouahab
  Nafissatou Yekini
  Carine Atezambong
  Kanjinga Mujanayi
  Yara Abdelfattah
  Mona Atallah
  Lidwine Rakotozafinoro
  Bernadettar Kwimbira
  Fanta Kone 
  Queency Victoire
  Mariem Chedad
  Soukaina Hamdi
  Fatiha Jermoumi
  Mimisen Iyorhe
  Afine Houda
  Diana Chikotesha

Video assistant referees

  Lahlou Benbraham
  Ahmed El-Ghandour
  Ahmed Ibrahim 
  Ahmad Heerallal
  Zakaria Brindisi
  Samir Guezzaz
  Haythem Guirat

Draw
 
The final draw was held in Rabat, Morocco on 29 April 2022 at 20:30 GMT (UTC±0). The twelve teams were drawn into three groups of four teams, with the hosts Morocco, reigning champions Nigeria, and next-highest-ranked Cameroon assigned to positions A1, C1, and B1, respectively.

Group stage
CAF released the official match schedule for the tournament on 29 April 2022.

All times are local,  (UTC+1).

Tiebreakers

Group A

Group B

Group C

Ranking of third-placed teams

Knockout stage

Bracket

Quarter-finals
The winners qualified for the 2023 FIFA Women's World Cup. The losers entered a repechage round.

Repechage
The winners advanced to the inter-confederation play-offs.

Semi-finals

Third place play-off

Final

Goalscorers

Awards
The following awards were given at the conclusion of the tournament:

Qualified teams for the 2023 FIFA Women's World Cup
The following teams will represent Africa directly at the 2023 FIFA Women's World Cup, while two more teams will have opportunities to join them through the inter-confederation playoffs.

1 Bold indicates champions for that year. Italic indicates hosts for that year.

Notes

References

External links

 
2022
2020s in Moroccan sport
Women Cup of Nations
2022 in women's association football
2023 FIFA Women's World Cup qualification
International association football competitions hosted by Morocco
July 2022 sports events in Africa